The C&C SR 27 is a Canadian racing sailboat that was designed by Glenn Henderson and first built in 1992.

Production
The design was built by C&C Yachts starting in 1992. Only eight boats were completed.

Design
The SR 27 is a small racing keelboat, built predominantly of fibreglass. It has a fractional sloop rig, a nearly plumb stem, an open reverse transom, an internally-mounted spade-type rudder controlled by a tiller and a lifting fin keel. It displaces .

The boat may be fitted with a small outboard motor for docking and maneuvering.

The design has a PHRF racing average handicap of 102 with a high of 105 and low of 99.

See also
List of sailing boat types

Related development
C&C SR 21
C&C SR 25
C&C SR 33

Similar sailboats
C&C 27
Catalina 275 Sport
Express 27

References

Keelboats
1990s sailboat type designs
Sailing yachts
Sailboat type designs by Glenn Henderson
Sailboat types built by C&C Yachts